Antonovo is a rural locality (a village) in Kubenskoye Rural Settlement, Vologodsky District, Vologda Oblast, Russia. The population was 3 as of 2002.

Geography 
The distance to Vologda is 59 km, to Kubenskoye is 20 km. Nizhneye, Vepri, Bogoslovo are the nearest rural localities.

References 

Rural localities in Vologodsky District